Marcus Nilsson (born May 18, 1991) is a Swedish professional ice hockey player. He is currently playing with Färjestad BK of the Swedish Hockey League (SHL).

Playing career
Nilsson made his Swedish Hockey League debut playing with AIK during the 2013–14 SHL season. He later moved to play with Färjestad BK.

On December 5, 2020, Nilsson joined the SCL Tigers of the National League as their fourth import player for the remainder of the 2020–21 season.

Awards and honours

References

External links

1991 births
Living people
AIK IF players
Bofors IK players
Färjestad BK players
People from Eda Municipality
SCL Tigers players
HC Sochi players
Swedish ice hockey forwards
Sportspeople from Värmland County